William "Billy" the Buffalo (debuted 2000 in Orchard Park, New York) is the official mascot of the NFL's Buffalo Bills. He is an  blue American buffalo and became the team's full-time mascot in 2000. He wears the uniform "number" BB (which is his initials).

Billy Buffalo was redesigned in 2018, with fan reception to the mascot's "makeover" being mixed. Jason Ballock, who wore the costume from 2006 to 2011, praised the design as more streamlined and "kid friendly".

References

External links

Buffalo Bills
National Football League mascots
Mascots introduced in 2000
2000 establishments in New York (state)
Animal mascots